
Fleet Hargate is a village in the South Holland district of Lincolnshire, England. It falls within the wider civil parish of Fleet, which stretches from Gedney to Holbeach with a total estimated population in 2011 of 2,136.

Community 
The village of Fleet Hargate has been designated a conservation area by South Holland District Council, one of 13 within the district.

Village amenities are a post office at The Chestnuts tea room, a public house - the Rose and Crown, a caravan park, a day nursery, and a farm shop that includes a garden centre and tea room.

History 
The village now sits just south of the A17, although previously the main road ran through the village. The Old Main Road as it is now named was part of the Boston to Lynn road, managed in part by the original Holbeach Turnpike trust.

The now closed Fleet railway station, formerly of the Midland and Great Northern Joint Railway, is on Eastgate. It was served by the Fleet Light Railway, a potato railway built around 1910 to connect the Worth family farms to the mainline railway.

The Bull, originally a pub and lodging house is (@2017) being turned into a private dwelling.

A Terrier of Fleet Lincolnshire is a 1920 publication based on the 11th-century manuscript Fleet Terrier – a 'terrier' is a legal document detailing land, similar to a Glebe terrier.

Alternate Spellings 
Fleet Hard Gate

References

External links

 Fleet Parish Council

Villages in Lincolnshire
South Holland, Lincolnshire